Creek Freedmen is a term for emancipated Creeks of African descent who were slaves of Muscogee Creek tribal members before 1866. They were emancipated under the tribe's 1866 treaty with the United States following the American Civil War, during which the Creek Nation had allied with the Confederacy. Freedmen who wished to stay in the Creek Nation in Indian Territory, with whom they often had blood relatives, were to be granted full citizenship in the Creek Nation. Many of the African Americans had removed with the Creek from the American Southeast in the 1830s, and lived and worked the land since then in Indian Territory. 

The term also includes their modern descendants in the United States. At the time of the war and since, many Creek Freedmen were of partial Creek descent by blood. Registration of tribal members under the Dawes Commission often failed to record such ancestry. In 2001, the Creek Nation changed its membership rules, requiring all members to prove descent to persons listed as "Indian by Blood" on the Dawes Rolls. The Creek Freedmen have sued against this decision.

History
Most of the Freedmen were former slaves of tribal members who had lived in both upper and lower Creek territories in the Southeast. In some villages, Creek citizens married enslaved men or women, and had mixed-race children with them. Interracial marriage was then common, and many Creek Freedmen were partly of Creek Indian ancestry.

Because most of the Muscogee (Creek) Nation allied with the Confederacy, after the Civil War's  Union victory, the United States in 1866 required a new treaty with the Creek Nation and others of the Five Civilized Tribes, which also had allied with the Confederacy.

The treaty required the tribes to emancipate their slaves and to offer them citizenship in the Creek and other nations, eligible for voting rights and shares of annuities and land settlements. The treaty called for the setting aside of the western half of the territory (thereafter called Unassigned Lands) for the United States to use for the settlement of freedmen and other American Indian tribes from the Great Plains. The Creek were forced to cede , for which the United States agreed to pay the sum of thirty cents per acre, amounting to $975,165. Article 4 of the treaty said that the US would conduct a census of the Creek tribe, to include the Freedmen.

In 1893, the United States Dawes Commission under the direction of Henry L. Dawes was established by an act of Congress. The Dawes Act was part of a continuing effort to assimilate American Indians and directed the break-up of communal tribal lands and the allotment of 160-acre plots to individual households. All members of each tribe had to be registered for land allotment. Beginning in 1898, the US officials created the Dawes Rolls to document the tribal members for such allotments; registrars quickly classified persons as "Indians by Blood," "Freedmen," or "Intermarried Whites." However, it included the Creek Freedmen citizens in the Creek nation. The enrollment under the Dawes Commission lasted until April 26, 1906. The final Dawes rolls constitute a record of documented ancestors of Creek Freedmen, but tribal members and historians have complained that the rolls were inaccurate.

The Dawes Rolls have been used as a kind of historic records that form a recognized base for determining tribal membership. Many of the tribes in Oklahoma have increasingly relied on them as sources from which they can require persons applying for membership to document direct descent from historical members of the tribe. Critics charge that many mistakes were made in how individuals were recorded. For instance, although many Freedmen were of Creek descent, they were included only on Freedmen rolls rather than being noted as being "Indian by Blood." Since the late 20th century, such designation as Freedmen has worked against many of their descendants as the Creek and other nations have tightened their rules for membership. 

Most of the Creek Freedmen were farmers in the 19th and the early 20th centuries. Some also owned bees and produced honey, such as Tartar Grayson, known as the "Great Bee Man." The children of Creek Freedmen attended racially-segregated schools, which were established in European-American areas as well, but they lived in Creek territory as citizens of the Creek nation.

Changes in membership rules
The peace treaty of 1866 granted the Freedmen full citizenship and rights as Creek regardless of proportion of Creek or Indian ancestry. The Muscogee (Creek) Nation in 1979 reorganized the government and constitution based on the Oklahoma Indian Welfare Act of 1936. It changed its membership rules, requiring that members be descendants of persons listed as 'Indians by Blood' on the Dawes Rolls. They expelled Creek Freedmen descendants who could not prove descent from such persons, despite the 1866 treaty, asserting their sovereign right to determine citizenship. Since the Creek changed their membership rules in 2001, they have excluded persons who cannot prove descent from persons listed on the Dawes Rolls as Indians by Blood.

References

External links
Muskogee County Indian Journal, "Local Happenings", 22 June 1876

African-American history of Oklahoma
African–Native American relations
 
Native American history of Oklahoma
Pre-statehood history of Oklahoma